Land ownership in Canada is held by governments, Indigenous groups, corporations, and individuals. Canada is the second-largest country in the world by area; at 9,093,507 km² or 3,511,085 mi² of land (and more if fresh water is not included) it occupies more than 6% of the Earth's surface. Since Canada uses primarily English-derived common law, the holders of the land actually have land tenure (permission to hold land from the Crown) rather than absolute ownership. The Crown is given permission to hold land by treaty granted by the Indigenous people of Canada.

Crown lands 

The majority of all lands in Canada are held by governments as public land and are known as Crown lands. About 89% of Canada's land area (8,886,356 km²) is Crown land, which may either be federal (41%) or provincial (48%); the remaining 11% is privately owned. Most federally administered land is in the Canadian territories (Northwest Territories, Nunavut and Yukon), and is administered on behalf of Aboriginal Affairs and Northern Development Canada; only 4% of land in the provinces is federally controlled, largely in the form of National Parks, Indian reserves, or Canadian Forces bases. In contrast, provinces hold much of their territory as provincial Crown land, which may be held as Provincial Parks or wilderness.

The largest class of landowners are the provincial governments, who hold all unclaimed land in their jurisdiction. Over 90% of the sprawling boreal forest of Canada is provincial Crown land. Provincial lands account for 60% of the area of the province of Alberta, 94% of the land in British Columbia, 95% of Newfoundland and Labrador, and 48% of New Brunswick.

The largest single landowner in Canada by far, and by extension one of the world's largest, is the Government of Canada. The bulk of the federal government's lands are in the vast northern territories where Crown lands are vested in the federal, rather than territorial, government. In addition the federal government owns national parks, First Nations reserves and national defence installations.

Until the Natural Resources Acts of 1930 the prairie provinces of Alberta, Saskatchewan, and Manitoba, and to a limited extent British Columbia, did not control Crown lands or subsoil rights within their boundaries, which instead rested with the federal government. This deprived them of the benefits of royalties from mining, oil and gas, or forestry (stumpage) within their boundaries. This was a major source of Western alienation at the time.

History of land distribution 
In New France land was settled according to the seigneurial system, which was similar to the type of late feudalism practised in France at the time, and land was divided into long strip lots running back from the riverfront. This land pattern was also used in certain areas of Western Canada by French and Métis settlers.

In contrast, areas of British settlement used square block patterns of land distribution. Those in Eastern Canada contoured around geographical features and consisted of smaller lots. In Western Canada, where the American-influenced Dominion Land Survey was used, geographical features were largely ignored in favour of geometric standardization, with larger lots.

In Canadian law all lands are subject to the Crown, and this has been true since Britain acquired much of Eastern Canada from France by the Treaty of Paris (1763). However, the British and Canadian authorities recognized that indigenous peoples already on the lands had a prior claim, aboriginal title, which was not extinguished by the arrival of the Europeans. This is in direct contrast to the situation in Australia where the continent was declared terra nullius, or vacant land, and was seized from Aboriginal peoples without compensation. In consequence, all of Canada, save a section of southern Quebec exempted by the Royal Proclamation of 1763, is subject to Aboriginal title. Native groups historically negotiated treaties in which they traded tenure to the land for annuities and certain legal exemptions and privileges. Most of Western Canada was secured in this way by the government via the Numbered Treaties of 1871 to 1921, though not all groups signed treaties. In particular, in most of British Columbia Aboriginal title has never been transferred to the Crown. Many native groups, both those that have never signed treaties or those that are dissatisfied with the execution of treaties have made formal Aboriginal land claims against the government.

The English Crown also gave tenure to much of Canada to a private company, the Hudson's Bay Company (HBC) which from 1670 to 1870 had a legal and economic monopoly on all land in the Rupert's Land territory (identical to the drainage basin of Hudson Bay), and later the Columbia District and the North-Western Territory (now British Columbia, the Yukon, the Northwest Territories, and Nunavut) were added to the HBC's lands, making it one of the largest private landowners in world history. In 1868 the Imperial Parliament passed the Rupert's Land Act that saw most of its land ownership transferred to the Dominion of Canada.

After Canada acquired the HBC's land in 1870, the federal government used the land as an economic tool to promote settlement and development. Under the Dominion Lands Act system of 1872, 25,000,000 acres were given to the Canadian Pacific Railway to fund its transcontinental line, other areas were reserved for school boards to be sold to fund education, and the rest was distributed to settlers for agriculture. This was at a time of extreme land shortage in many agricultural areas of Europe, and aided in the rapid settlement of Western Canada. In areas where ranching was preferred to field agriculture (e.g. southern Alberta), large areas were leased to cattle barons at a nominal rate, allowing the development of an industrial-scale beef export industry centred on the city of Calgary.

At the same time, major land reforms were underway in Prince Edward Island to end the practice of absentee landlordism, which locals felt exploited them. The Government of Canada agreed to provide the Island with an $800,000 fund to purchase the remaining absentee landlord's estates as part of negotiations that brought PEI into Confederation.

Lands given out in the early years of the Dominion Lands Act included rights to the subsoil, including all minerals, oil, or natural gas found below the property. Later grants (after circa 1900) did not include subsoil rights. As a result, in the leading petroleum-producing province of Alberta, 81% of the subsurface mineral rights are owned by the provincial Crown. The remaining 19% are owned by the federal Crown, individuals, or corporations.

Characteristics of modern distribution 
Canada may be considered distinct from the few large landed estates and masses of tenant farmers typical of Old World and Latin American countries that have not enacted land reforms, the communal and state ownership typical of Communist countries, or the small-holdings in those parts of Europe and Latin America where the estates were broken up.

Recent trends 
In the last century, the trend in Canada has been for a smaller percentage of people to own land, as more urbanization has turned people into renters. Still Canada has one of the world's highest rates of home ownership, which actually increased during the economic boom of the mid 2000s. In 2008, of the 12.4 million households in Canada, more than 8.5 million, over two-thirds (68.4%) owned their home, the highest rate since 1971. Much of the recent increases were in the form of condominiums, however, which are not land ownership in the traditional sense. In 1981, less than 4% of owner households owned condominiums. By 2001, this proportion had more than doubled to 9%, and by 2006, it had reached 10.9%. Again, this reflects the impact of urbanization which has changed land holding patterns substantially.

In rural areas, the trend has been towards further farm consolidation. The number of farms has continually decreased since the end of the pioneering era in Western Canada (as recently as the 1930s in some regions, but more generally 1914), and at the same time, farm sizes have increased.

The other trend in rural Canada is for more urbanites to own summer homes, cottages, cabins, acreages, and hobby farms.  This is especially apparent in areas that are situated within a convenient driving distance of major urban centres.  Because Canada's major urban centres were historically founded on prime agricultural land, the end result is a permanent loss of agricultural land.  This trend is further exacerbated by low-density residential subdivisions being constructed at the margins of cities, as well as the appearance of isolated rural residential "satellite subdivisions" specifically designed for complete car dependency.

See also
 Land tenure
 Landholder
 Patterns of landholding: Feudalism / Smallholding / Commune / Sharecropping

References

Geography of Canada
Property law of Canada
Real estate in Canada
Land tenure